Ian Johnson (March 1949 – 26 June 2019) was an Australian businessman.

Originally a long-time senior executive at the Nine Network (GTV-9), in October 2003 Johnson moved to the Seven Network to become managing director of Channel Seven Melbourne.

Johnson died in June 2019 aged 70.

References 

1949 births
2019 deaths
Australian television executives
People educated at Trinity Grammar School, Kew